Daniel Mulloy (born 1977) is a British artist and filmmaker.

Short films
The work of Daniel Mulloy has often been defined by both its starkness and deceptive simplicity. Mulloy's short films have won over one hundred international festival awards. According to Filmmaker magazine, Mulloy "is one of the world's most well regarded short filmmakers." 
 

He has won four BAFTAs, two of which are British Academy Film Awards, a BIFA and received two nominations for the European Film Academy Award. He received the British Academy Film Award for his films Antonio's Breakfast and Home and received the British Independent Film Award for his film Baby. His short films Dad, Antonio's Breakfast and Baby premiered at Sundance Film Festival.

Feature films
According to Screen International (8 July 2011) Mulloy's (rumoured) first feature film as writer/director A Cold Day is "set in a tough New York high school" and will star Melissa Leo. It is being made for Focus Features.

Mulloy is (rumoured) to be developing Mitrovica, a Kosovo set film, through the Sundance Institute Feature Film Program.

Mulloy produced the Cuban set film Una Noche directed by his sister Lucy Mulloy. Una Noche premiered at the 2012 Berlin International Film Festival. Una Noche won multiple awards at Tribeca Film Festival ahead of its 2013 US theatrical release.

Mulloy is a passionate believer in the 'Cinema Community' and the DIY attitude that exists within it:

"A community with many strong and individual voices. A community with the festival circuit at its core, making films that shed light on the shape of the world we live in. This community, from my experience, is very good at supporting its members with networks for young non-funded filmmakers helping one another, crewing and offering advice on each others shorts and features." European Film Academy catalog

Activism
Mulloy partners with the United Nations to raises awareness of the crisis for migrating populations and refugees. In 2017 he was awarded the Golden Lion at Cannes Lions International Festival of Creativity for his work with the United Nations High Commissioner for Refugees.

Filmography

References

External links 
 

BAFTA winners (people)
1977 births
People from Carmarthen
People from Brixton
British film directors
British male screenwriters
British film producers
Alumni of the Slade School of Fine Art
Living people
Hunter College alumni